is the second album from the J-pop idol group Morning Musume. It was released on July 28, 1999 and sold a total of 428,990 copies.

Overview
It was released both on CD with the catalogue number EPCE-5025 and MiniDisc with the catalogue number EPYE-5025. It includes Morning Musume's first #1 single, Daite Hold on Me!.

The first pressing of Second Morning comes in special packaging with a trading booklet. 7 types of booklets were released in total, each identified by a unique color and containing slightly different photos. The colors are red, orange, yellow, green, light blue, blue and purple.

Because Asuka Fukuda graduated from Morning Musume before this album came out, she does not appear on the album's cover artwork. However, her vocals are still heard on tracks 3, 6 and 11.

Track listing

External links 
Second Morning entry at Up-Front Works

Morning Musume albums
Zetima albums
1999 albums